The  are a Japanese women's softball team based in Takasaki, Gunma. The Bee Queen compete in the Japan Diamond Softball League (JD.League) as a member of the league's East Division.

History
The Bee Queen were founded in 1981, as Hitachi Takasaki (a factory of Hitachi) softball team. The team was transferred to Renesas in 2003, and was transferred to Bic Camera in 2015.

The Japan Diamond Softball League (JD.League) was founded in 2022, and the Bee Queen became part of the new league as a member of the East Division.

Roster

References

External links
 
 Bic Camera Takasaki Bee Queen - JD.League
 
 

Japan Diamond Softball League
Women's softball teams in Japan
Sports teams in Gunma Prefecture